Lynas Rare Earths, Ltd.  is an Australian rare-earths mining company, listed on the Australian Securities Exchange as a S&P/ASX 200 company. It has two major operations: a mining and concentration plant at Mount Weld, Western Australia, and a refining facility at Kuantan, Malaysia. The company was founded in the 1990s and is headquartered in Perth, Western Australia. Lynas Rare Earths is one of the largest rare earths mining companies in the world and has operations in Australia, Malaysia, and other countries. The company is known for its Mt. Weld mine in Western Australia, which is one of the largest rare earths mines in the world.

History
The company was founded in 1983 as Yilgangi Gold NL. The company took on the Lynas Gold N.L. name in 1985.[1] It became publicly listed in 1986 on the ASX. In 2001, it sold off its gold division and focused on rare earths.[1]

Lynas was founded by the Sumich family of Perth, Western Australia. Perth based mining identity, Mr Les Emery was appointed its first CEO and Managing Director in 1986, remaining with Lynas until 2001.

In 1994, following an exploration discovery, Lynas opened its first gold mine at Lynas Find, 130 km south of Port Hedland, Western Australia. In 1998 it jointly developed a second gold mine at Paraburdoo, in the Ashburton region of Western Australia, with Sipa Resources.

In 2000 Les Emery identified an opportunity to diversify Lynas into the rare earths industry, when he became aware that Ashton Mining was attempting to sell off the Mount Weld rare earths project. He concluded an agreement for Lynas to purchase the project and in 2001 Lynas changed its name to Lynas Corporation Limited. Later in the same year Les Emery was replaced as CEO and Managing Director by Sydney based Nicholas Curtis.

Mount Weld 
In May 2009, Lynas was offered funding of $252 million by the Chinese state-owned China Non-Ferrous Metal Mining (Group) Co., which would have taken a 51.6% stake in the company. However the deal was scrapped by Australia's Foreign Investment Review Board on concern it would threaten supply to non-Chinese buyers. Lynas later raised $450 million in a share sale.

In November 2010, it signed an agreement with the Japanese rare-earths trading company Sojitz to export €450 million Euros worth of rare-earth minerals from its mine in Mount Weld.

Crown deposit 
In April 2011, Lynas was attempting to sell its Crown polymetallic deposit (which is particularly prospective for niobium) at Mount Weld to Forge Resources. Forge, a company listed on the ASX, also shared the one and only common Director and CEO of Lynas, Nicholas Curtis, (Lynas current CEO is Amanda Lacaze) although former Lynas executive director Harry Wang was also involved with Forge and the transaction. In a 2007 Company presentation, Lynas claimed that the Crown deposit was worth $50 billion but have valued it at $20.7 million for sale to Forge. Curtis as a director of Forge would receive a 24,000,000 performance shares if the deal between Lynas and Forge proceeds. Certain commentators and journalists have called into question the regulatory oversight of the Australian Securities & Investments Commission (ASIC) as to the legality of such a proposal, but were proven to have been uninformed or alarmist because the proposal was always subject to the approval of independent shareholders at an Extraordinary General Meeting (EGM). The EGM was cancelled by Lynas after shareholder opposition to the proposal became apparent, and the Crown polymetallic deposit remains owned by Lynas.

Lynas Advanced Materials Plant 
The Lynas Advance Materials Plant (LAMP) was built near Kuantan, Pahang, Malaysia. The LAMP commenced operations in 2012.

Kuantan MP Fuziah Salleh has been raising her concerns over the risks of having a rare-earth processing plant near Kuantan in the Parliament of Malaysia since 18 November 2008. A civil society group "Concerned Citizens of Kuantan" was formed in December 2008, after a meeting held by Fuziah to meet with about twenty residents and professionals from different ethnic groups and NGOs in Kuantan to discuss their concerns.

In early March 2011, an article published in the New York Times raised the public awareness concerning the LAMP. Since then, the Kuantan community group protesting against the LAMP led by Kuantan MP Fuziah Salleh has gradually evolved into a bigger group, i.e. Save Malaysia Stop Lynas (SMSL). The group is currently led by Bentong MP Wong Tack.

An Australian Greens MP, Robin Chapple, has shot down Lynas Corp's attempt to ship radioactive waste from Malaysia back to Western Australia state saying that the Western Australia Nuclear Waste Storage (Prohibition) Act 1999 forbids the import of radioactive waste.

On 5 September 2012, Lynas (Malaysia) Sdn Bhd was awarded a temporary operating licence by Malaysia's Atomic Energy Licensing Board for a period of two years. Despite concerns about the plant and its alleged lack of a proper long term disposal plan for its waste, a two-year temporary licence was issued.

On 19 December 2012, the Malaysian Court of Appeal dismissed an appeal by 'Save Malaysia Stop Lynas group' against a temporary operating licence granted to Lynas, with costs in favour of Lynas.

The refining facility entered production in 2013, producing 1,089 tonnes of rare-earth oxides in the first quarter of 2014, with a target of 11,000 tonnes per annum. On 2 September 2014, Lynas was issued a 2-year Full Operating Stage License (FOSL) by the Malaysian Atomic Energy Licensing Board (AELB)

In September 2018, the newly elected Pakatan Harapan government called for a thorough review of the Lynas rare earth processing plant in Gebeng, Kuantan. Fuziah Salleh, the Deputy Minister in the Prime Minister's Department has been appointed as the chairwoman of the said Lynas evaluation committee, for a three-month tenure beginning 24 September 2018. Fuziah promises a fair review of the Lynas rare earth refinery, saying that she will "look out for the best interest of Kuantan residents" However, shares of Lynas tumbled following the official confirmation that Fuziah, a long-time critic of the plant, will head the government review of its operations.

In response to this, Amanda Lacaze, the CEO and managing director of Lynas Corporation Limited wrote an open letter to the government and people of Malaysia. Lynas acknowledges the absolute right of the government to conduct a review if it is done in a fair, transparent and scientific manner, including adherence to the proper process and in keeping with other recent initiatives of the new government. Lynas expressed confidence in its performance and track record, called for the review committee to be independent, and technically equipped for making informed judgments, besides following a clearly defined scope and terms of reference. Lacaze also asked that sufficient time can be given to Lynas to adapt to new policies.

On 30 December 2021, Lynas announced it had secured environmental approvals from Malaysian authorities to build a permanent disposal facility for water leached purification residue at Gebeng industrial estate.

See also
MP Materials

References

External links
 

Mining companies of Australia
Mining in Malaysia
Companies based in Sydney
Companies established in 1983
1983 establishments in Australia
Companies listed on the Australian Securities Exchange
Rare earth companies
Metal companies of Australia